Cheraw dance is a traditional cultural dance performed in Mizoram, India, consisting of mostly six to eight people holding pairs of bamboo staves on another horizontally placed bamboo on the ground. The male performers then clap  
the bamboos rhythmically while groups of female dancers dance in intricate steps between the beating bamboos . It is the most famous and beautiful dance in Mizoram, and is the center of attraction during festive occasions. Similar dances are found in the Myanmar, Southwest China and in the Philippines.In the Philippines they have a similar dance called Tinikling that also uses bamboo sticks. A Guinness World Record was made in 2010, when a large number of cheraw dancers danced together at the same time.

The Cheraw dance is characterized by the use of bamboo staves, which are kept in cross and horizontal forms on the ground. While the male dancers move these bamboo staves in rhythmic beats, the female dancers perform by stepping in and out of the bamboo blocks. Recognized as one of the oldest dances of Mizoram, the Cheraw dance has become an integral part of almost every festival of Mizoram.

History
It is believed that the Cheraw dance originated as early as the 1st century AD. Long bamboo staves are used for this dance, therefore many people call it "Bamboo Dance". 
In the ancient time, Cheraw dance was performed in rituals as believed, to provide solace to the soul of a deceased mother who had passed on leaving her newborn child on earth. However, the traditional beliefs have been diluted and the horizon of Cheraw Dance has expanded considerably. In fact this dance is performed on every occasion by the Mizo of Mizoram.

Format
More often than not the various movements made by the Cheraw dancers are inspired by the nature. While some expressions of Cheraw Dance resemble the swaying of trees some others indicate the flying of birds as well as the harvesting of ripe paddy. There is no denying the fact that Cheraw  Dance is surely a most enchanting form of Mizoram culture.
Aptly supported by two bases, the bamboos are clapped not together on a particular beat by the male dancers. The females who have a perfect sense of timing, dance gracefully by stepping in and out of the crossed and horizontally laid bamboo staves.  The dancers move by stepping alternatively in and out from between and across a pair of horizontal bamboos, held against the ground by people sitting face to face on either side. They tap the bamboos in rhythmic beats. The bamboos, placed horizontally, are supported by two bases, one at each end. The bamboos, when clapped, produce a sound which forms the rhythm of the dance. It indicates the timing of the dance as well. The dancers steps in and out to the beats of the bamboos whilst moving their arms in a swinging motion choreographed aesthetically with ease and grace.

Modern
Later practice of Cheraw is accompanied by accordion, mandolin and guitar played in non traditional clothes.

Dress code
The common costumes worn by the performers during the Cheraw dance include: 

Women
Vakiria - is a female headress made of bamboo and decorated with feathers, beetles wings and other colorful objects, from the 1960s it evolved into the present form.
Kawrchei - White red green black blouse.
Puanchei - White red green black sarong.
Men
Khumbeu - Bamboo hat
Mizo Shawl
All these traditional costumes of Cheraw Dance come in vibrant colors that further brighten up the surrounding environment.

References

External links
 Mizoram Tourism
 mapsofindia.com

Indian folk dances
Group dances
Culture of Mizoram